Ghazni (formerly Ghazna) is a city in central Afghanistan. It may also refer to:

Places 
 Ghazni Province, Afghanistan, of which the city is the capital
 Ghazni District, district surrounding the city
 Citadel of Ghazni, fortress in Ghazni
 Ghazni under the Ghaznavids, history of the city under the Ghaznavid dynasty
 Ghazni Minarets, minaret towers in Ghazni
 Ghazni Airport, airport in Ghazni
 Ghazni University, public university in Afghanistan
 Forward Operating Base Ghazni, International Security Assistance Force base in Afghanistan
 Ghazni Khel, union council in Khyber Pakhtunkhwa, Pakistan

People 
 Ghazni (Bagram captive), one of the first Bagram captives to face trial under Afghan justice, see Misri Gul
 Abu Ishaq Ibrahim of Ghazna, Samanid governor of Ghazni
 Arslan-Shah of Ghazna (d. 1118), Ghaznavid ruler
 Böritigin of Ghazni, Samanid governor of Ghazni
 Ibrahim of Ghazna (1033–1099), Ghaznavid ruler
 Ismail of Ghazni, emir of Ghazni, brother of Mahmud
 Khusrau Shah of Ghazna (1121–1160), Ghaznavid ruler
 Mahmud of Ghazni (971–1030), the most prominent ruler of the Ghaznavid Empire
 Masʽud I of Ghazni (998–1040), Ghaznavid ruler, son of Mahmud
 Mas'ud III of Ghazni, Ghaznavid ruler
 Mawdud of Ghazni (died 1050), Ghaznavid ruler
 Muhammad of Ghazni (died 1041), Ghaznavid ruler, son of Mahmud
 Sanai or Abu-l-Majd Majdud Sana’i of Ghazna (1080–1131/1141), Persian poet from Ghazni
 Shir-Zad of Ghazna, Ghaznavid ruler
 Toghrul of Ghazna, Ghaznavid general

Others 

Ghazni prison escape, 2015 Taliban prison break
 Ghazni Province road crash, 2016 accident in Afghanistan

See also 
 Ghaznavi (disambiguation)
 Battle of Ghazni (disambiguation)
 List of governors of Ghazni